Goose Cove is a settlement situated between Dunfield and Trinity in Newfoundland and Labrador.

Populated places in Newfoundland and Labrador